Mirza Mahdi Ashtiani (1888–1952), a man of wisdom, mystic, man of literature, was a Great Master in the philosophical School of Tehran.

Birth and family

Mirza Mahdi was born in 1889 in Tehran. His father, Mirza Jafar was the relatives of Hajj Mirza Muhammad Hasan Ashtiani, famous as the Little Mirza, one of the most great men of knowledge in Tehran.

Education

Mirza Mahdi Ashtiani passed his childhood and adolescence in Tehran. After he passed the preliminary courses, he participated in the sessions of great teachers. He could read the Quran completely when he was 5 years old.

He learned mathematics from scholars such as al-Shaykh 'Abd al-Husayn Siybiwayh, Mirza Ghaffariyan Najm al-Dula, Mirza Jahanbakhsh Munajjim Burujirdi and Aqa Shaykh Muhammad Husayn Riyadi.

Teachers
Mirza Mahdi had many great teachers, some of which are as follows:
 Mirza Abu l-hasan Jelveh 
 Mirza hasan Kermanshahi 
 Mir Shahab Neirizi 
 Aqa Mir Shirazi 
 Mirza Hashem Eshkevari 
 Ayatollah Mohammad Kazem Khorasani
 Ayatollah Mohammed Kazem Yazdi
 Ayatollah Sayyed Muhammad Firouz Abadi 
 Aqa Zia Iraqi 
 Ayatollah Sayyid Abu al-Hasan Isfahani
 Mirzaye Naini

Career
He taught in different places such as Marvi School, Sepahsalar School, and the school of Mirza Muhammad Khan Qazvini. Sayyed Jalal Addin Ashtiani Says that:" He taught twelve times the book of Healing of Avicenna, two times the book of Tamhid Al Qavaed and many times the book of Asfar of mulla Sadra.

Works

Aqa Mirza MAhdi Ashtiani has many books in different subjects mainly in the sphere of Wisdom and mysticism. Some of them are:
 Asas At Tawhid (the foundation of unity)
 Notes on the book of Poems of Wisdom
 Notes on Asfar in Arabic
 notes on Shefa (the book of Healing)
 notes on Fosus Al Hikam of Ibn Arabi
 Notes On the Book of Kefayeh (the knowledge of principles)
 notes on Makaseb

Death 
Mirza Mahdi Ashtiyani died on April 23, 1953, and his body was buried in Shrine of Fatima al-Ma'suma in Qom, Iran.

References

1888 births
1952 deaths
20th-century Iranian philosophers
Iranian writers
Iranian Muslim mystics
Pupils of Muhammad Kadhim Khorasani
Burials at Fatima Masumeh Shrine